Nils Svenwall (1918–2005) was a Swedish art director.

Selected filmography
 Ride Tonight! (1942)
 Night in Port (1943)
 Little Napoleon (1943)
 The Old Clock at Ronneberga (1944)
 The Emperor of Portugallia (1944)
 His Majesty Must Wait (1945)
 Man's Woman (1945)
 The Journey Away (1945)
 Evening at the Djurgarden (1946)
 Kristin Commands (1946)
 The Balloon (1946)
 Don't Give Up (1947)
 How to Love (1947)
 Rail Workers (1947)
 The Girl from the Marsh Croft (1947)
 Life at Forsbyholm Manor (1948)
 Private Bom (1948)
 A Swedish Tiger (1948)
 Port of Call (1948)
 Father Bom (1949)
 Love Wins Out (1949)
 Dangerous Spring (1949)
 Woman in White (1949)
 Fiancée for Hire (1950)
 The Quartet That Split Up (1950)
 The Kiss on the Cruise (1950)
 Two Stories Up (1950)
 Beef and the Banana (1951)
 Customs Officer Bom (1951)
 Skipper in Stormy Weather (1951)
 Blondie, Beef and the Banana (1952)
 Say It with Flowers (1952)
 Bom the Flyer (1952)
 Love (1952)
 Defiance (1952)
 Encounter with Life (1952)
 Dance, My Doll (1953)
 Dance in the Smoke (1954)

References

Bibliography
 Cowie, Peter. Swedish Cinema. Zwemmer, 1966.

External links

1918 births
2005 deaths
Swedish art directors
People from Borås